Lenoir County is a county in the U.S. state of North Carolina. As of the 2020 census, its population was 55,122. Its county seat is Kinston, located on the Neuse River, across which the county has its territory.

Lenoir County comprises the Kinston Micropolitan statistical area.

History
The county was formed in 1791 from the southern part of Dobbs County. It was named for William Lenoir (1751-1839), an officer in the American Revolutionary War who took part in the Battle of Kings Mountain. He was a prominent political leader; when the county was established, he was serving as Speaker of the North Carolina Senate.

Geography

State and local protected site
 CSS Neuse

Major water bodies 
 Contentnea Creek
 Neuse River
 Southwest Creek
 Wheat Swamp (Contentnea Creek tributary)

Adjacent counties
 Greene County - north
 Pitt County - northeast
 Craven County - east
 Jones County - southeast
 Duplin County - southwest
 Wayne County - west

Major highways

  (Concurrency with US 70)
 
 
 
 
 
 
 
 
 
 

The main highway in the county is US 70, which offers access to the North Carolina coast and I-95. Other highways that run through the county include US 258, NC 11, NC 58, NC 903 and NC 55. Interstate 95 is the closest Interstate Highway to the county, 50 miles west in Selma.

Major Infrastructure 
 Amtrak Thruway (Kinston)
 Kinston Regional Jetport 
 Global TransPark
 Greyhound Bus Terminal with a location in Kinston.

Demographics

2020 census

As of the 2020 United States census, there were 55,122 people, 23,148 households, and 14,863 families residing in the county.

2010 census
The United States Census Bureau's most recent census, taken on April 1, 2010, estimated there were 59,495 residents with 24,327 households and 15,993 families residing within the county.  The population density was 149 people per square mile (58/km2). There were 27,184 housing units at an average density of 68 per square mile (26/km2). The county's racial makeup was 56.47% White, 40.43% Black or African American, 0.18% Native American, 0.34% Asian, 0.05% Pacific Islander, 1.88% from other races, and 0.66% from two or more races.  3.17% of the population were Hispanic or Latino of any race.

There were 23,862 households, out of which 31.30% had children under the age of 18 living with them, 46.40% were married couples living together, 17.30% had a female householder with no husband present, and 32.20% were non-families. 28.40% of all households were made up of individuals, and 11.80% had someone living alone who was 65 years of age or older. The average household size was 2.43 and the average family size was 2.96.

In the county, the population was spread out, with 25.30% under the age of 18, 7.90% from 18 to 24, 27.60% from 25 to 44, 24.60% from 45 to 64, and 14.60% who were 65 years of age or older. The median age was 38 years. For every 100 females there were 90.30 males. For every 100 females age 18 and over, there were 84.70 males.

The median income for a household in the county was $31,191, and the median income for a family was $38,815. Males had a median income of $28,879 versus $21,536 for females. The per capita income for the county was $16,744. About 12.60% of families and 16.60% of the population were below the poverty line, including 22.00% of those under age 18 and 18.40% of those age 65 or over.

Government and politics

Throughout the first two-thirds of the twentieth century, Lenoir County was a typical overwhelmingly Democratic "Solid South" county. It was always carried by the Democratic Presidential nominee between at least 1876 and 1964, following upon which "American Independent" candidate George Wallace obtained a majority of the county's vote in 1968 amidst large-scale opposition to racial desegregation and civil rights for African-Americans. In every election since, Lenoir County has voted for the Republican presidential nominee, although on several occasions the GOP margin has been extremely close and on only five occasions out of twelve has the margin been more than ten percentage points.

Lenoir County is a member of the Eastern region in the North Carolina Councils of Government.

Lenoir County is represented by Chris Humphrey in the House of Representatives and Jim Perry in the North Carolina's 7th Senate district, who was appointed by Governor Roy Cooper on January 31, 2019. As of 2018, after redistricting, Lenoir County is in the 12th district for the North Carolinian State House, represented by George Graham. The current county commissioners are J. Mac Daughety (R), Eric Rouse (R- Vice Chairman), June Cummings (D), Preston Harris (D), and Roland Best (D), at large commissioners are Linda R Sutton (D-Chairman) and Chad Rouse (R). The Board of Education's chairman is Jonathan Sargeant (D), vice chairman Bruce Hill (D), and members Billy Davis (R), Keith King (R), Elijah Woods (D), and Merwyn K. Smith (D).

Education

Higher Education 
Lenoir County is home to one higher learning institution, Lenoir Community College - which is located at 231 NC HWY 58 South, Kinston and is part of the North Carolina Community College System. The college offers associate degrees, diplomas, or certificates for educational programs in college transfer, business, industry, public services, health sciences, and continuing education. Programs and support services are accessible through traditional and distance learning options.

Primary and Secondary Education 
Public education in Lenoir County is administered and supported by the Lenoir County Public School Board, which formed from a merge of the City of Kinston and Lenoir County school systems in 1992. There are four public high schools in Lenoir County: Lenoir County Early College, North Lenoir, South Lenoir, and Kinston High School. Three public middle schools: E.B. Frink, Rochelle, and Woodington. There are also eight public elementary schools: Banks, La Grange, Moss Hill, Northeast, Northwest, Pink Hill, Southeast and Southwood. Additionally, Contentnea-Savannah is a K-8 school.

Lenoir County is also home to two private academies - Arendell Parrott Academy and Bethel Christian Academy - and two charter academies - Kinston Charter Academy and Children's Village Academy.

Libraries 
Neuse Regional Library serves the residents of Lenoir, Greene, and Jones counties. With eight different locations, the library system offers services such as 3D printing and an inter-library loan system, as well as an eLibrary.

Health
Lenoir County is home to UNC Lenoir Healthcare, a 261-bed non-profit hospital in Kinston.

Communities

City 
 Kinston (county seat and largest city)

Towns 
 La Grange
 Pink Hill

Census-designated places 
 Deep Run
 Graingers
 Jackson Heights

Other unincorporated community 
 Tick Bite

Townships 

 Contentnea Neck
 Falling Creek
 Institute
 Kinston
 Moseley Hall
 Neuse
 Pink Hill
 Sand Hill
 Southwest
 Trent
 Vance
 Woodington

Notable people 
 Brandon Ingram (NBA player)
 Larry Beck (professional golfer)
 Jocelyn Brown (R&B singer)
 Reggie Bullock (NBA player)
 Dwight Clark (49ers wide receiver)
 David Christopher Hatcher (MLB pitcher)
 Donna Horton White (professional golfer)
 Malcolm Howard (U.S. Judge appointed by Ronald Reagan)
 Susan Owens (the seventh woman to serve on Washington Supreme Court)
 Maceo and Melvin Parker (Jazz musicians)
 Jamie Pressley (U.S. actor)
 Frank Snepp (journalist)
 Jerry Stackhouse (NBA player)
 Quinton Coples (NFL defensive end)
 Frank Lucas (American mobster) 
 Vivian Howard (American chef)

See also
 List of counties in North Carolina
 National Register of Historic Places listings in Lenoir County, North Carolina
 List of future Interstate Highways

References

External links

 
 
 NCGenWeb Lenoir County - free genealogy resources for the county

 
1791 establishments in North Carolina
Populated places established in 1791
Majority-minority counties in North Carolina